The Eastern Syria insurgency is an armed insurgency being waged by remnants of the Islamic State of Iraq and the Levant (ISIL) and both pro and anti-Syrian government Arab nationalist insurgents, against the Autonomous Administration of North and East Syria (AANES), its military (the Syrian Democratic Forces (SDF)), and their allies in the US-led Combined Joint Task Force – Operation Inherent Resolve (CJTF–OIR) coalition.

Background

The insurgency began after a series of campaigns in 2016 and 2017 which took territory from the Islamic State of Iraq and the Levant, led by the Syrian Democratic Forces and the CJTF-OIR. This eventually resulted in the taking of the Islamic State capital of Raqqa, and other areas in the Aleppo, Raqqa and Deir ez-Zor Governorates. These are Arab-majority areas, often with large Turkmen minorities, some of whom resented the Kurdish influence in the SDF.

Multiple factions, made up mostly of Arabs, have formed armed groups in support of either the Syrian opposition or Syrian government, with additional Islamic State remnants operating as clandestine cells who have emerged in areas captured by the SDF and the coalition during the 2016-2017 campaigns. These groups have also utilized guerilla tactics to target the SDF and Coalition forces, including assassinations, hit and run attacks, rocket attacks and use of improvised explosive devices (IEDs). Attacks have occurred in cities across Rojava, including Manbij, Raqqa and Hasakah.

Insurgent factions
Islamic State of Iraq and the Levant: Following the loss of most of its territory, the Islamic State of Iraq and the Levant has launched a desert-based insurgency, while simultaneously attempting to rally elements of the civilian population to its cause. By attacking SDF-backed civil authorities, it undermines the latter's reputation and worsens existing grievances, resulting in a deteriorating security situation. It is unclear how many active ISIL fighters still operate in Syria, but they probably number several thousands.
Government loyalists: Various pro-government groups operate in eastern Syria, including the "Popular Resistance of the Eastern Region" (founded in February 2018 in Raqqa), the "Popular Resistance in Hasakah" (founded in April 2018), and the "Popular Resistance in Manbij" (founded in June 2018). These groups are reportedly supported by Iran, and elements of the Syrian Armed Forces such as the Baqir Brigade. The SDF and AANES government have accused Iran of organizing assassinations in SDF-held areas, attempting to turn locals against the SDF and U.S. American presence.

Timeline

2017
November – Harakat al-Qiyam attempted to assassinate SDF commander Muhammad Abu Adel with an IED in Manbij, leaving him injured.

2018
5 April – The Popular Resistance claimed to have carried out a mortar or rocket attack on a U.S. base at Ayn Issa.
6 April – The Baqir Brigade vowed to aid the pro-government insurgency in territories held by U.S.-allied forces.
17 May – U.S. special forces arrested ISIL commanders following an air drop near the Iraqi border in al-Hasakah Governorate.
17 August - A Base housing US and French Special Forces near Deir ez-Zor was attacked by ISIL members. The attack was repelled and at least seven jihadist were killed 
2 September – 5 SDF militiamen were killed and wounded by an IED planted in Raqqa.
31 October – The Turkish military and SDF began clashes with stated future goals of a Turkish-led operation in Manbij. The fighting lasted one week, with the United States responding by establishing observation posts in Manbij to prevent further violence.
2 November – ISIL gunmen assassinated the prominent tribal leader Sheikh Basheer Faisal al-Huwaidi in broad daylight in the city of Raqqa.
4 November – A car bomb exploded in the city of Raqqa, killing at least one person and injuring ten more people, which included members of the SDF. ISIL claimed responsibility for the attack through its Amaq News Agency.
4 December – YPG claimed to have arrested four members of Harakat al-Qiyam, allegedly collaborating with Turkish intelligence.

2019

January–March
January – the founder of the Arab Ahwaz Brigade, an Arab Free Syrian Army group from Deir ez-Zor, was killed by an IED planted by ISIL in Deir ez-Zor. He reportedly joined the Syrian Democratic Forces and became involved with its Deir ez-Zor Military Council serving as a leader in the council.
16 January – the Manbij bombing killed 15 Manbij Military Council (MMC) fighters and four US soldiers. ISIL claimed the attack through its news agency Amaq.
21 January – an ISIL suicide SVBIED targeted a US convoy accompanied by SDF troops on the Shadadi-Hasakah road in the Jazira Region, killing five SDF personnel. Witnesses say the SVBIED rammed into an SDF vehicle by a checkpoint held by Kurdish forces a dozen kilometers outside Shadadi as the US convoy drove past.
7 February – the SDF media center announced the capture of 63 ISIL operatives in Raqqa, part of a sleeper cell. They were all arrested within a 24-hour period, ending the day-long curfew that had been imposed on the city the day before.
9 February – ISIL militants attacked SDF fighters near the al-Omar oilfield, triggering airstrikes by the U.S.-led Coalition. SOHR said 12 Islamic State fighters attacked the SDF and clashed with them for several hours until most of the attackers were killed. Ten attackers were reportedly killed, while two managed to flee. Other activist collectives, including the Step news agency, reported the attack, saying some of the attackers used motorcycles rigged with explosives.
21 February – two successive SVBIEDs detonated in the market area of Shahil, Syria - 10 kilometers from the SDF's al-Omar oilfield HQ - killing 14 people. SOHR reported a car bomb that was detonated remotely as a convoy of workers and technicians that worked at the oilfield was passing by. SOHR said 20 were killed and others wounded. SVBIED attacks were also reported in Afrin and the village of Ghandura near Jarablus.
9 March – eight people were wounded when a suicide bomber blew up a car in Manbij, near a market. The Islamic State claimed responsibility for the attack.
14 March – an IED in Raqqa targeted a US military convoy. Al-Masdar reported that the pro-Syrian government Popular Resistance of Raqqa group claimed responsibility and that they had killed SDF fighters and injured U.S. soldiers, but that these claims could not be independently verified and that neither the US nor SDF confirmed the reports.
26 March – ISIL gunmen opened fire on a checkpoint in Manbij, killing seven MMC fighters.

April–June
3 April – An ISIL cell clashed with the SDF and the Asayish in Raqqa, with 4 ISIL fighters blowing themselves with explosive belts, according to SOHR.
5 April – About 200 ISIL detainees revolted and attempted to escape from Dêrik prison in al-Malikiyah. The breakout was foiled, and some of the prisoners were subsequently distributed to other detention centers.
10 April – ISIL cells attacked SDF fighters at a checkpoint in rural Deir Ez Zor on the outskirts of the town of al-Shuhayl, the cell reportedly used machine guns and RPGs during the attack, as part of a global campaign launched by ISIL, which the group has called "The campaign in revenge for the blessed Province of the Levant" after losing territorial control in Syria after the Battle of Baghuz Fawqani, which has prompted the group to carry out a series of attacks around the world where the group has a presence, as well as encouraging supporters to carry out lone wolf attacks in their countries, other attacks related to the group's call for vengeance have occurred in Libya and Iraq.
12 April – ISIL claimed responsibility for an attack in Manbij against members of the SDF.
23 April – Major protests began in the cities of Al-Busayrah and Shuhail in the eastern part of the Deir ez-Zor Governorate in opposition to SDF and Kurdish rule.
7 May – A senior commander in the SDFs' Deir ez-Zor military council claimed that Iran, Turkey, and the Syrian government are collaborating to destabilize SDF controlled areas with fighters from Operation Euphrates Shield and al-Nusra remnant cells in eastern Syria. The commander also claimed there is ideological support for ISIL and al-Nusra among the local populations, particularly in the towns of Jadidat Agidat, Shehail, and Basira, which is a hub for Deir ez-Zor's tribes and has also been the site for recent protests against SDF administration. The commander also claimed that the SDF had foiled 180 attempted attacks against SDF, and claimed that Turkey and the Syrian Government provide support for these attacks.
11 May – Unidentified gunmen attacked a YPG headquarters in the western part of the town of Shuhail, where ongoing protests against the SDF were occurring.
30 May – U.S. special forces arrested 15 ISIL members following an air drop in Qana village in al-Hasakah Governorate.

July–September
1 July – U.S. special forces arrested two ISIL commanders following an air drop in Attala village in al-Hasakah Governorate.
7 July – SDF forces arrested at least 30 people and confiscated their belongings in Al-Izba village in Deir ez-Zor Governorate. On the same day, U.S. special forces arrested an ISIL commander after encircling his house in Al-Harijiyeh village in Deir Ezzor Governorate.
12 July – U.S. special forces killed an ISIL commander in the area between al-Suwar and Abu al-Nitel village.
14 July – According to Al-Masdar, the SDF and U.S. special forces killed ISIL's oil minister Thabit Sobhi Fahd Al-Ahmad during a raid somewhere in Deir ez-Zor Governorate.
25 July – SDF forces arrested 8 ISIS members within the east Euphrates area.
1 September – The SDF's Anti-Terror Units captured Mohammed Remedan Eyd al-Talah, ISIL's chief financial officer, during a raid in ash-Shahil, Deir ez-Zor Governorate.

October–December

October – The U.S. withdrew from many of its bases in northern Syria in early October, substantially reducing its presence there and disrupting anti-ISIL operations. Nevertheless, the U.S., with Kurdish, Turkish and Iraqi assistance, conducted  a successful high-stakes special operations raid in Barisha, Idlib targeting ISIL Caliph Abu Bakr al-Baghdadi; the raid resulted in Baghdadi's death and ISIL selecting a new leader/Caliph Abu Ibrahim al-Hashimi al-Qurashi. By the end of October, the U.S. had adopted a subordinate mission to protect SDF-controlled oil and gas infrastructure, including oil fields, from the ISIL insurgency as the insurgent  group had previously used profits from oil smuggling to fund its activities. The U.S. deployed mechanized infantry units for the first time in its intervention to "reinforce" its presence in eastern Syria and to assist its continuing anti-ISIL insurgency mission.
22 November – Coalition forces accompanied by allies attacked ISIL enclaves near the Iraqi border, which reportedly resulted in multiple ISIL fighters being killed and wounded. While up to 600 ISIL fighters are thought to be defending a small pocket stronghold in Syria's eastern province of Deir ez-Zor.
26 November – A car bomb went off in an area under the control of Turkish and allied rebel forces west of Ras al-Ayn, killing at least 17 people and injuring 20 others. The attack happened at a local village market. The Turkish government blamed YPG and PKK for the attack.

2020

January–March
1 January – 16 ISIS fighters  were captured during a raid in Deir ez-Zor Governorate by the Coalition forces.
14 January – SDF managed to kill two ISIL members, including Abu Alward Al-Iraqi, who was responsible for oil trading, in the Deir ez-Zor Governorate.
17 January – During an explosion targeting an SDF vehicle in Abu Hardub village in the eastern countryside of Deir Ezzor, one SDF member was killed and one more injured.
27 January – Coalition Bradley IFVs were pulled out of Syria after less than two month of deployment due to unspecified reasons.
11 February –  U.S. special forces arrested 3 suspected ISIL members following an air drop in ash-Shahil, Deir ez-Zor Governorate.

April–June
17 May – Two regional ISIS leaders, Ahmad 'Isa Ismail al-Zawi and Ahmad 'Abd Muhammad Hasan al-Jughayfi, were killed by coalition forces in Deir Ezzor Governorate.
22 May –  U.S. special forces killed an ISIL commander and arrested another following an air drop in ash-Shahil, Deir ez-Zor Governorate.
26 May – The Iraqi counter-terrorism agency announced that a U.S. airstrike managed to kill Mu'taz Numan 'Abd Nayif Najm al-Jaburi, a senior leader and bomb-maker in ISIS, in Deir Ezzor Governorate. The U.S. Rewards for Justice Program used to offer up to $5 million reward to information that would bring him to justice.
29 June – U.S. special forces arrested suspected ISIL members following an air drop in ash-Shahil, Deir ez-Zor Governorate.

July–December
ISIL militants reportedly continued to routinely extort doctors, shop owners, heads of factories, landowners, and many others to pay them zakat.

October 2020 – SDF announced plans to free thousands of Syrians held at the al-Hawl refugee camp.

2021

11 January – Three people including a former Asayish member were assassinated by unidentified gunmen on a motorcycle near Al-Busayrah, Deir ez-Zor Governorate.
10 May – An SDF member was assassinated in al-Busaiteen, near the town of al-Suwar, meanwhile four SDF members were killed when ISIS militants opened fire on their bus in Al-Kabar, western countryside of Deir ez-Zor.
13 August – U.S. coalition conducted a special operation to arrest an ISIS militant in Mahamida near Abu Khashab, Deir ez-Zor.
13 December - The SDF stated that counter-terrorism forces had killed five members of an ISIL cell hiding in al-Busayrah during a joint raid with the coalition. Most of the five militants wore explosive belts, the SDF stated. SOHR said four members of a family were also killed, two of which were targeted by coalition helicopter gunfire while trying to flee on a motorbike.

2022
20 January – The al-Hasakah prison attack begins.

11 September – ISIS attack kills 6 SDF fighters in Deir Ez-Zor

See also
Islamic State insurgency in Iraq (2017–present), a similar insurgency in neighboring Iraq
Second Northern Syria Buffer Zone
Syrian Desert campaign (December 2017–present)
SDF insurgency in Northern Aleppo
Insurgency in Idlib

Notes

References

Further reading 

Military operations of the Syrian civil war in 2017
Military operations of the Syrian civil war in 2018
Military operations of the Syrian civil war in 2019
Military operations of the Syrian civil war involving the Islamic State of Iraq and the Levant
Military operations of the Syrian civil war involving the Syrian Democratic Forces
Military operations of the Syrian civil war involving the United States
September 2017 events in Syria
Deir ez-Zor Governorate in the Syrian civil war